Ocobla is an unincorporated community in Neshoba County, in the U.S. state of Mississippi.

History
The community takes its name from Ocobla Creek, which flows near the site. A post office called Ocobla was established in 1886, and remained in operation until 1903.

References

Unincorporated communities in Mississippi
Unincorporated communities in Neshoba County, Mississippi
Mississippi placenames of Native American origin